Colombia is scheduled to compete at the 2017 World Aquatics Championships in Budapest, Hungary from 14 July to 30 July.

Diving

Colombia has entered 10 divers (seven male and three female).

Men

Women

Mixed

High diving

Colombia qualified two male high divers.

Swimming

Colombian swimmers have achieved qualifying standards in the following events (up to a maximum of 2 swimmers in each event at the A-standard entry time, and 1 at the B-standard):

Men

Women

Synchronized swimming

Colombia's synchronized swimming team consisted of 2 athletes (2 female).

Women

References

Nations at the 2017 World Aquatics Championships
2017
World Aquatics Championships